Iridopsis is a genus of moths in the family Geometridae first described by Warren in 1894.

Species
The following species are classified in the genus. This species list may be incomplete.
Iridopsis angulata
Iridopsis clivinaria – mountain mahogany looper moth
Iridopsis cypressaria
Iridopsis dataria
Iridopsis defectaria – brown-shaded gray moth
Iridopsis emasculatum
Iridopsis ephyraria – pale-winged gray moth
Iridopsis fragilaria
Iridopsis gemella
Iridopsis humaria – small purplish gray moth
Iridopsis jacumbaria
Iridopsis larvaria – bent-line gray moth
Iridopsis obliquaria – oblique looper moth
Iridopsis perfectaria
Iridopsis pergracilis – cypress looper moth
Iridopsis profanata
Iridopsis providentia
Iridopsis pseudoherse
Iridopsis sancta
Iridopsis sanctissima
Iridopsis vellivolata – large purplish gray moth

References

Boarmiini